Atlanten stadion is a multi-use stadium in Kristiansund, Norway. It is currently used mostly for football matches and track-and-field competitions, and is the former home ground of Eliteserien team Kristiansund BK. Kristiansund BK played at Atlanten Stadion until 2007, when they moved to Omsundet, Frei. Atlanten Stadion has a rubber track for track and field meets, but this has fallen into deterioration.

Renovation
As of 2019, Atlanten Stadion is being renovated completely.

References

Football venues in Norway
Athletics (track and field) venues in Norway
Buildings and structures in Kristiansund
Sports venues in Kristiansund
Bandy venues in Norway